Ptychotheca is a monotypic moth genus in the family Geometridae. Its only species, Ptychotheca pallidivirens, is found in New Guinea. Both the genus and species were first described by William Warren, the genus in 1906 and the species in 1903.

References

Eupitheciini
Taxa named by William Warren (entomologist)
Moth genera